Oleg Evgenyevich Menshikov, PAR (born 8 November 1960) is a Russian actor, theatre director and occasional singer. He is the current artistic director of the Yermolova Theatre in Moscow.

Internationally, Menshikov is the best known for his roles in the films by Nikita Mikhalkov Burnt by the Sun (1994), The Barber of Siberia (1998), Burnt by the Sun 2: Exodus (2010) and Burnt by the Sun 2: Citadel (2011), as well as for his performance in Régis Wargnier's East/West (1999).

Menshikov is the winner of a Laurence Olivier Award, a Nika Award and three State Prizes of the Russian Federation, and the recipient of the Order of Honour of the Russian Federation.

Early life 
Menshikov was born in Serpukhov, Moscow Oblast, to father Evgeny (born 1934), a military engineer, and mother Yelena (born 1933), a doctor.

In addition to regular school, Menshikov also attended music school, where he played the piano and the violin. In 1977, he enrolled the Mikhail Shchepkin Higher Theatre School, where he studied acting under Vladimir Monakhov.

Career 
Menshikov had his debut role in the 1980 television film Zhdu i nadeyus by Suren Shazbazyan. The next year he made his film debut in Family Relations, which was his first collaboration with Nikita Mikhalkov. Menshikov then went on to star a series of successful films that made him a star in the Soviet Union, including Flights in Dreams and Reality, My Favourite Clown, Through Main Street with an Orchestra and Moonzund. He garnered further critical acclaim for his performance in Dyuba-Dyuba (1992), for which he was nominated for a Nika Award.

Menshikov first attracted international media attention in the Globe Theatre production When She Danced, for which he won the 1992 Laurence Olivier Award for Best Actor in a Supporting Role. He gained further success with Nikita Mikhalkov's Burnt by the Sun, in which he portrayed a manipulative and suicidal NKVD agent during Joseph Stalin's Great Purge. Burnt by the Sun won the Grand Prize at the Cannes Film Festival and the Academy Award for Best Foreign Language Film. Menshikov reprised his role in the Burnt by the Sun sequels Burnt by the Sun 2: Exodus (2010) and Burnt by the Sun 2: Citadel (2011).

In 1996, Menshikov starred in Sergei Bodrov's Prisoner of the Mountains, for which he won a Nika Award for Best Actor. He went on to star in Mikhalkov's The Barber of Siberia (1998) opposite Julia Ormond, and in Régis Wargnier's East/West (1999) opposite Sandrine Bonnaire and Catherine Deneuve. His most recent credits include performances in the television series Prime Suspect 6 (2003), films The State Counsellor (2005) as Erast Fandorin and Legend № 17 (2013) as Anatoly Tarasov, and the miniseries Doctor Zhivago (2006). 

In 1997, Menshikov was the President of the Jury at the 20th Moscow International Film Festival. Since 2012, he has served as the artistic director of the Yermolova Theatre in Moscow.

Menshikov is a three-time winner of the annual State Prize of the Russian Federation for his outstanding contribution to film art. In 2003, he was named a People's Artist of Russia. Menshikov was presented with the Order of Honour in 2010.

Personal life 
In 2005, Menshikov married fellow actress Anastasia Chernova. He resides in Moscow.

Filmography

Awards and nominations

Honours 
 France: Ordre des Palmes Académiques (2003)
 Russia: People's Artist of Russia (2003)
 Russia: Order of Honour (2010)
 Russia: Lev Nikolaev Medal for Achievement in Art

References

External links 

1960 births
Living people
People from Serpukhov
Soviet male film actors
Russian male film actors
Soviet male television actors
Russian male television actors
Russian male stage actors
Russian theatre directors
Recipients of the Order of Honour (Russia)
People's Artists of Russia
State Prize of the Russian Federation laureates
Laurence Olivier Award winners
Recipients of the Nika Award